The New Mexico School for the Deaf (NMSD) is a state-run school in Santa Fe, New Mexico, providing education for deaf and hard-of-hearing students from preschool through grade 12. Established in 1887 by the New Mexico legislature, it is the only land-grant school for the deaf in the United States.

Facilities 
Several of NMSD's buildings are historical landmarks designed in the Santa Fe Pueblo architectural style.  The campus includes Dillon Hall, Hester Hall, Connor Hall, Cartwright Hall, Delgado Hall, Belle & Cora Larson Dining Hall, Lars M. Larson Residential Complex & Activity Center, James A. Little Theater, Library & Museum and the Superintendent's Residence.

It has a boarding facility with a capacity of 96 students.

It has preschool facilities in Albuquerque, Farmington, and Las Cruces.

References

External links
NMSD Web site

Public K-12 schools in the United States
Public high schools in New Mexico
Educational institutions established in 1885
Schools for the deaf in the United States
Schools in Santa Fe County, New Mexico
Public middle schools in New Mexico
Public elementary schools in New Mexico
1885 establishments in New Mexico Territory
Public boarding schools in the United States
Boarding schools in New Mexico